Giovanni Roncagli (1857–1929) was an Italian naval officer and hydrographer.

Biography
Roncagli was born in 1857.
He enlisted in the navy in 1875, attending the Royal Naval School of Naples.
In his biography Vita di mare he tells of his early career, at a time when sailing ships were only slowly being replaced by steam.
Roncagli was the hydrographer for the Italian expedition to explore Patagonia and Tierra del Fuego of 1881–1882, led by Giacomo Bove.
Decio Vinciguerra was officially both zoologist and botanist, but in fact Carlos Luigi Spegazzini from Buenos Aires handled the botanical work.
The geologist Domenico Lovisato made up the scientific party.

Giovanni Roncagli became a navy captain, an expert in commercial geography and a member of the Italian Naval League.
He was secretary general of the Italian Geographic Society from 1897 until World War I (1914–1918).
He also became director of the Navy's historical section.
He was a pioneer in aeronautical topography in Italy, which quickly turned out to be of great importance in World War I.
In 1913 Roncagli presented a report to the Tenth International Geographical Congress in Rome in which he discussed the need for an international aeronautical map.

Bibliography

Notes and references
Citations

Sources

 

1857 births
1929 deaths
Hydrographers
Hydrologists